Permyaki is a rural locality (a selo) in Petropavlovskoye Rural Settlement, Bolshesosnovsky District, Perm Krai, Russia. The population was 171 as of 2010. There are 4  streets.

Geography 
Permyaki is located 31 km west of Bolshaya Sosnova (the district's administrative centre) by road. Kuznetsy is the nearest rural locality.

References 

Rural localities in Bolshesosnovsky District